Leuckartiara is a genus of cnidarians belonging to the family Pandeidae.

The genus has cosmopolitan distribution.

Species:

Leuckartiara acuta 
Leuckartiara adnata 
Leuckartiara annexa 
Leuckartiara brownei

References

Pandeidae
Hydrozoan genera